Secnidazole (trade names Flagentyl, Sindose, Secnil, Solosec) is a nitroimidazole anti-infective. Effectiveness in the treatment of dientamoebiasis has been reported. It has also been tested against Atopobium vaginae.

In the United States, secnidazole is FDA approved for the treatment of bacterial vaginosis and trichomoniasis in adult women.

References

Further reading 

 

Nitroimidazole antibiotics
Antiprotozoal agents